

The Morane-Saulnier MS.43 was a French two-seat training biplane designed and built by Morane-Saulnier for a 1924 French War Ministry requirement for an intermediate training biplane.

The MS.43 was developed from the prototype MS.42; the equal-span wings of the MS.42 were replaced with the upper wing having a greater span than the lower. The structure was also strengthened for its training role, it being expected that trainee pilots would land it hard on airfields with rough surfaces. The aircraft had tandem cockpits with dual controls and was powered by a 180 hp (134 kW) Hispano-Suiza V-8 engine. The aircraft entered service with the French Air Force and 79 were built. In 1929 the aircraft were withdrawn from service and sold on the civilian market.

Specifications

References

Further reading

 

1920s French military trainer aircraft
MS.043
Biplanes
Aircraft first flown in 1924